Gwendoline Anne Sutherland (1921–1995) was a New Zealand cricketer who played as a right-arm off break bowler and right-handed batter. She played in three Test matches for New Zealand in 1957. She played domestic cricket for Wellington.

References

External links
 
 

1921 births
1995 deaths
Cricketers from Perth, Western Australia
New Zealand women cricketers
New Zealand women Test cricketers
Wellington Blaze cricketers